This is a list of media in Monroe, Louisiana.

Television

KEJB did not receive a companion channel for a digital television station. Instead, on or before June 12, 2009, which is the end of the digital TV conversion period for full-service stations, KEJB was required to turn off its analog signal and turn on its digital signal (called a "flash-cut"). While a digital signal did go on the air (though it shut down on June 4, 2010 due to equipment failure, the station never filed for either a license to cover or an extension of the construction permit, and it was deleted by the FCC on December 22, 2010.

Radio

AM stations

FM stations

Newspapers

Daily
The major daily newspaper serving the Monroe-West Monroe and Ark-La-Miss area is Monroe News-Star. Its headquarters are located in midtown Monroe.

Ouachita Parish is served by the daily The Ouachita Citizen.

Non-daily

The Delta Style (part of Monroe News Star) and Money Saver serve Northeast Louisiana, Southeast Arkansas, and Western Mississippi.

See also
 Louisiana media
 List of newspapers in Louisiana
 List of radio stations in Louisiana
 List of television stations in Louisiana
 Media of locales in Louisiana: Baton Rouge, Lafayette, New Orleans, Shreveport, Terrebonne Parish

Monroe